Luke A. McKay (born 17 July 1981) is an Australian film director and screenwriter. He was born in Blacktown, New South Wales, Australia and is of Maltese, Irish and Scottish descent.

Awards include "Best International Film" at the 2016 South Dakota Film Festival and a Platinum Remi Award for "Dramatic Original Short" at the 2016 WorldFest-Houston International Film Festival for his short film Colt 13. Also "Best Picture" and "Best Director" at the 2012 New England Underground Film Festival (formerly New Haven Underground Film Festival) and "Best Foreign Short" at the 2013 Bare Bones International Film Festival for his short film Hit and Run.

Nominations include "Best Short Film" at the 2016 Boston Film Festival, the "Golden Knight" Award at the 2016 Golden Knight Malta International Film Festival, "Best Director - Short Film" at the 2015 Sydney Indie Film Festival and "Best Director" at the 2017 Red Dirt International Film Festival for Colt 13. Also "Best Short Short" at the 2012 Action On Film International Film Festival, "Best Short Narrative" at the 2012 Denver Underground Film Festival for Hit and Run and "Best Action Sequence in a Short Film" at the 2011 Action On Film International Film Festival for his short film The End.

Other works include online fashion content/TVC's for David Jones, featuring Victoria's Secret supermodel Miranda Kerr and for JLH, featuring former Miss Universe, Jennifer Hawkins.

Filmography

Short films

References
 Influx Magazine review for Colt 13
 Film Threat review by Phil Hall (US writer) for Hit and Run

External links
 
 Luke A. McKay youtube site

1981 births
Living people
Australian film directors